Ray Staszak (born December 1, 1962) is an American retired professional ice hockey player. He played four games in the National Hockey League with the Detroit Red Wings during the 1985–86 season. A highly touted prospect and a free agent out of college, he signed a million dollar college with the Red Wings, the first college free agent to do so.

Staszak played high school hockey at Archbishop Ryan High School in Philadelphia, and also participated in midget hockey in his native Bucks County. He later played in the United States Hockey League.

Career statistics

Regular season and playoffs

Awards and honors

References

External links

1962 births
Living people
Adirondack Red Wings players
AHCA Division I men's ice hockey All-Americans
American men's ice hockey forwards
Detroit Red Wings players
Ice hockey players from Pennsylvania
Sportspeople from Philadelphia
UIC Flames men's ice hockey players
Undrafted National Hockey League players